Crataegus monogyna, known as common hawthorn, one-seed hawthorn, or single-seeded hawthorn, is a species of flowering plant in the rose family Rosaceae. It is native to Europe, northwestern Africa, and West Asia, but has been introduced in many other parts of the world.

Names
This species is one of several that have been referred to as Crataegus oxyacantha, a name that has been rejected by the botanical community as too ambiguous. In 1793, Medikus published the name C. apiifolia for a European hawthorn now included in C. monogyna, but that name is illegitimate under the rules of botanical nomenclature.

Other common names include may, mayblossom, maythorn, (as the plant generally flowers in May in the English-speaking parts of Europe) quickthorn, whitethorn, motherdie, and haw.

Description
The bark is dull brown with vertical orange cracks. The upper surface is dark green above and paler underneath.

The hermaphrodite flowers are produced in late spring (May to early June in its native area) in corymbs of 5–25 together; each flower is about 10 mm in diameter and has five white petals, numerous red stamens and a single style; they are moderately fragrant. The flowers are pollinated by midges, bees, and other insects, and later in the year bear numerous haws. The haw is a small, oval, dark red fruit about 10 mm long, berry-like, but structurally a pome containing a single seed. Haws are important for wildlife in winter, particularly thrushes and waxwings; these birds eat the haws and disperse the seeds in their droppings.

The common hawthorn is distinguished from the related but less widespread Midland hawthorn (C. laevigata) by its more upright growth, the leaves being deeply lobed, with spreading lobes, and in the flowers having just one style, not two or three. They are interfertile, however, so hybrids occur frequently; they are only entirely distinct in their more typical forms.

Uses

Food 
The fruit of hawthorn, called haws, are edible raw, but are commonly made into jellies, jams, syrups, or wine, or to add flavour to brandy.  Botanically, they are pomes, but they look similar to berries. A haw is small and oblong, similar in size and shape to a small olive or grape, and red when ripe. The haws develop in groups of two or three along smaller branches. They are pulpy and delicate in taste. In this species (C. monogyna), they have only one seed, but other species of hawthorn  may have up to five seeds.

The petals are also edible, as are the leaves, which if picked in spring when still young are tender enough to be used in salads. Hawthorn petals are used in the medieval English recipe for spinee, an almond milk-based pottage recorded in 'The Forme of Cury' by the Chief Master-Cook of King Richard II, .

Medicine 

C. monogyna is one of the most common species used as the "hawthorn" of traditional herbalism. The plant parts used are usually sprigs with both leaves and flowers, or alternatively the fruit ("berries"). Hawthorn has been investigated by evidence-based medicine for treating cardiac insufficiency.

C. monogyna is a source of antioxidant phytochemicals, especially extracts of hawthorn leaves with flowers.

Gardening and agriculture
Common hawthorn is extensively planted as a hedge plant, especially for agricultural use. Its spines and close branching habit render it effectively livestock- and human-proof, with some basic maintenance. The traditional practice of hedge laying is most commonly practised with this species. It is a good fire wood, which burns with a good heat and little smoke.

Numerous hybrids exist, some of which are used as garden shrubs. The most widely used hybrid is C. × media (C. monogyna × C. laevigata), of which several cultivars are known, including the very popular 'Paul's Scarlet' with dark pink double flowers. Other garden shrubs that have sometimes been suggested as possible hybrids involving the common hawthorn, include the various-leaved hawthorn of the Caucasus, which is only very occasionally found in parks and gardens.

Culture 
In pre-modern Europe, hawthorn was used as a symbol of hope, and also as a charm against witchcraft and vampires. Hawthorn was believed by some to have the ability to inhibit intruding supernatural forces, and was also thought to be sacred in nature due to an association between the hawthorn bush and the crown of thorns that, according to the New Testament, was placed on Jesus.

As protection against witchcraft, hawthorn was sometimes placed in the cradles of infants, or around houses and doorways. The Greeks reportedly placed pieces of hawthorn in casement windows to prevent witches from entering houses, while Bohemians placed hawthorn on the thresholds of cow houses for the same purpose. Hawthorn was sometimes placed on the coffin of a deceased person, on top of the person's corpse, or in the corpse's sock. In Bosnia, women would sometimes place a piece of hawthorn behind the headcloth of a recently deceased person, and then throw away the remaining twig on their way home. If the deceased person was a vampire, it would focus its attention on the hawthorn instead of following the woman home. Among the South Slavs, stakes made of hawthorn or blackthorn wood were considered effective in impaling vampires.

Notable trees 
An ancient specimen, and reputedly the oldest tree of any species in France, is to be found alongside the church at Saint Mars sur la Futaie, Mayenne. The inscription on the plaque beneath reads: "This hawthorn is probably the oldest tree in France. Its origin goes back to St Julien (third century)"; such claims are impossible to verify.

A famous specimen in England was the Glastonbury or Holy Thorn which, according to legend, sprouted from the staff of Joseph of Arimathea after he thrust it into the ground while visiting Glastonbury in the first century AD. The tree was noteworthy because it flowered twice in a year, once in the late spring which is normal, but also once after the harshness of midwinter had passed. The original tree at Glastonbury Abbey, felled in the 1640s during the English Civil War, has been propagated as the cultivar 'Biflora'. A replacement was planted by the local council in 1951, but was cut down by vandals in 2010.

The oldest known living specimen in East Anglia, and possibly in the United Kingdom, is known as the Hethel Old Thorn, and is located in the churchyard in the small village of Hethel, south of Norwich, in Norfolk, UK. It is reputed to be more than 700 years old, having been planted in the 13th century.

See also
 The hawthorn button-top gall on hawthorn is caused by the dipteran gall-midge Dasineura crataegi.
 Folklore about hawthorns, primarily the European species C. laevigata and/or C. monogyna and hybrids between the two
 Haweater
 List of Lepidoptera that feed on hawthorns

References

Further reading

External links

 Philips, R. (1978). Trees of North America and Europe . New York: Random House. .
 Kheloufi, A., Mansouri, L. M., & Vanbellinghen, C. (2019). "Seed germination of Crataegus monogyna—a species with a stony endocarp". Reforesta (7), 73–80.
 Bahorun, Theeshan, et al. (2003). "Phenolic constituents and antioxidant capacities of Crataegus monogyna (Hawthorn) callus extracts". Food/Nahrung 47.3 (2003): 191–198.
 Crataegus monogyna in Topwalks
 Hawthorn Gallery (photographs of a number of such trees, including Hethel Old Thorn)
 
 Crataegus monogyna at Flora Iberica

monogyna
Flora of North Africa
Flora of Western Asia
Trees of Europe
Trees of Mediterranean climate
Trees of Asia
Garden plants of Europe
Garden plants of Asia
Medicinal plants of Africa
Medicinal plants of Asia
Medicinal plants of Europe
Ornamental trees
Taxa named by Nikolaus Joseph von Jacquin